Seven is the third extended play by Dutch electronic musician Martin Garrix. Released on 28 October 2016, the EP was released via Stmpd Rcrds, and features collaborations with Mesto, Jay Hardway, Julian Jordan, Matisse & Sadko and Florian Picasso, as well as writing contributions from Giorgio Tuinfort among others. The tracks were issued one per day between 15 and 21 October 2016. Based on Extended edition from Beatport, the EP was secretly released via Epic Amsterdam.

Track listing

Charts

References 

Martin Garrix albums
2016 EPs
Dance music EPs
Sony Music EPs